S43 may refer to:

Submarines 
 , of the Royal Navy
 , of the Indian Navy
 , of the United States Navy

Other uses 
 County Route 563 (New Jersey), designated New Jersey Route S43 until 1953
 County Route S43 (Bergen County, New Jersey)
 Harvey Airfield, in Snohomish, Washington, United States
 Sikorsky S-43, an American flying boat
 Sulfur-43, an isotope of sulfur
 S43, a postcode district in Chesterfield, England